Gonçalo Nuno da Silva Abreu (born 25 June 1986) is a Portuguese former professional footballer who played as a forward.

Formed at Marítimo where he made nine Primeira Liga appearances, he spent most of his career in LigaPro, playing 206 games and scoring 31 goals in service of eight clubs.

Club career
Born in Funchal on the island of Madeira, Abreu came through the ranks of hometown club C.S. Marítimo, playing mainly in their reserves in the third division while also making a handful of appearances for the first team in the Primeira Liga. He scored once in the group stage of the UEFA Europa League on 6 December 2012, heading the opening goal of a 2–1 home win against Club Brugge KV.

Abreu was loaned for a year each to second-tier Varzim S.C. in June 2009, and C.D. Feirense a year later, playing regularly and winning promotion as runners-up with the latter. In January 2012, he moved to Atlético Clube de Portugal of the same league on the same basis.

In July 2013, Abreu left Marítimo and signed with Ermis Aradippou FC, newly promoted to the Cypriot First Division. Unused, he returned home with A.D. Camacha of division three in January, then rejoined Feirense in June 2014. 

Abreu remained in the second division the following years, with F.C. Penafiel, C.F. União, Gil Vicente F.C. and C.D. Mafra.

References

External links

1986 births
Living people
Sportspeople from Funchal
Portuguese footballers
Madeiran footballers
Association football forwards
Primeira Liga players
Liga Portugal 2 players
Segunda Divisão players
C.S. Marítimo players
Varzim S.C. players
C.D. Feirense players
Atlético Clube de Portugal players
F.C. Penafiel players
C.F. União players
Gil Vicente F.C. players
C.D. Mafra players
Ermis Aradippou FC players
Portuguese expatriate footballers
Expatriate footballers in Cyprus
Portuguese expatriate sportspeople in Cyprus